Silencer is the name of different characters appearing in American comic books published by Marvel Comics.

Publication history
The Count Barzon version of Silencer first appeared in Marvel Premiere #49 and was created by Mark Evanier and Sal Buscema.

The Akyia Badaranaike version of Silencer was created by writer Peter B. Gillis and artist Brent Anderson and debuted in Strikeforce: Morituri #13 (December 1987), whereupon she joins the title cast until her death in issue #23. She was the only African and second black team member to be featured in the cast, after Adept.

The Dean Helm version of Silencer was a supervillain and made his first and only appearance in Hawkeye Vol.1 #2 (1983), created by Mark Gruenwald.

The fifth version appeared in She-Hulk volume 2, #5.

Fictional character biography

Count Barzon
Accepting an assignment from the Bodavian Freedom Party, Count Barzon heads out to kill the outspoken and troublesome editorializer named Sigjid Roshkoff. At the Bodavian Embassy in New York, Silencer abducted Sigjid where he had him write a confession retracting the editorials. Afterwards, Silencer killed him. Barzon later became Silencer again and attacks a Communist rally to throw off suspicion. This led him into conflict with Falcon where Silencer threw a grenade that Falcon had to dispose of which enabled Silencer to get away. During a rally in Sigjid's honor, Barzon hired a thug named Hal Doerner to pose as Silencer so that Barzon can kill him to throw off any suspicions. Falcon followed a clue in Sigjid's confession letter. After figuring it out, Falcon apprehended Barzon and handed him over to the police.

Akyia Badaranaike

Akiya Badaranaike lived a peaceful life in Africa, until the alien race known as the Horde declared war on Earth, frequently plundering its resources and periodically slaughtering or enslaving parts of the population. Unfortunately, the Horde also decided to set up its earthbound headquarters in Africa, conquering most of it through war and forming a base in South Africa. Akiya's family was killed throughout this expedition of the Horde. Later, her lover was also killed in a raid of the Horde, leaving her with intense hatred for the aliens and a desire to avenge her loved ones. Later, while in a refugee camp in Gabon, Akiya was tested and found genetically eligible to undergo the elite Morituri process. Akiya decided to volunteer for the program. Her self-described goal was to make the world a better place for lovers by killing as many Hordians as possible.

The Morituri process granted superhuman abilities to ordinary humans, to be used as soldiers of Earth in its fight against the Horde. The powers came at a terrible price, however: the recipients were aware they would die within a year of receiving it, owing to a fatal flaw to it that made it unstable. Nevertheless, Akiya enthusiastically underwent the process and emerged with the ability to psychically break down sound waves, thus producing silence. Akiya named herself "Silencer" and officially debuted as a member of the third generation of Strikeforce: Morituri.

Months later, the Morituri found out that a team of doctors, authorized by their employers, the Paedia Council, had attempted to produce new Morituri without the supervision of the inventor of the process, Dr. Kimmo Tuolema, but the rushed and careless efforts of the doctors turned the new Morituri into horrible monstrosities. The new Morituri, suffering in their new form, begged the veteran Morituri to release them from their agony and kill them. Silencer respected their wish and euthanized them by stopping their hearts. After they had all died, Silencer screamed with rage and sorrow.

Sometime later, fellow team member Hardcase confessed to Silencer that he would die a virgin, without ever having felt the love of a woman. Surprised, Silencer offered to introduce him in the joy of love. The two struck a relationship and made love together. Shortly afterwards, the team defended a chocolate factory from being plundered by the Horde. The fight proved unusually easy, and Hardcase decided to exit the factory and hunt down some of the fleeing Hordians, taking Silencer along with him. As they exited hand-in-hand, however, the Hordians from a ship above activated a microwave cannon which incinerated both Hardcase and Silencer, leaving behind their charred skeletons. Silencer and Hardcase were then seen hand-in-hand moving to the afterlife together.

Dean Helm
Crossfire hired Silencer to kill Hawkeye when Hawkeye and Mockingbird found out there were illegal activities taking place at Cross Technological Enterprises. Silencer followed Hawkeye back to his apartment and attempted to kill him in his sleep. Hawkeye awoke before Silencer was able to shoot and, with the help of Mockingbird, foiled the assassin's attempt at his life. Silencer was able to escape by jumping out a window. Later that night, Hawkeye and Mockingbird broke into Cross Technological Enterprises to try to find incriminating evidence, but were interrupted by Silencer. During the fight, both Silencer and Hawkeye fell out of a window and landed on Hawkeye’s skycycle. The two fought on the skycycle until they both fell towards a smokestack. Hawkeye fell into the smokestack, while Silencer fell onto the rim. Believing Hawkeye to be dead, Silencer turned away looking for a way to climb down. It was then that Hawkeye grabbed Silencer’s foot and pulled him into the smokestack and (presumably) falling to his doom.

Although the character's name is unrevealed during his first appearance, Silencer's real name is revealed to be Dean Helm in the Official Handbook of the Marvel Universe A-Z Hardcover #3.

Mob enforcer
The Silencer is an unnamed mob enforcer who joined some gang members into looking for the evidence that linked the crime boss Alphonse Scarpetti to the courthouse killings. They start by tracking down Sam "Big Bear" Lincoln who used to be a boxer and mob enforcer and now works as a janitor at the Hayden Planetarium. They were unable to get the answers out of Lincoln, so Silencer snapped his neck. They headed to MacKinley Stewart upon figuring out that Lincoln sent the evidence to him. As Elektra was friends with Stewart, she came to his rescue causing Scarpetti to send in Silencer. Elektra was defeated by Silencer as his fellow gangsters looted Stewart's room and found what they are looking for. With help from Spider-Man, Elektra figures out that Scarpetti is behind the attacks. As Spider-Man prevents Elektra from killing Scarpetti, Silencer appears where he attacks Elektra with an axe. Spider-Man leapt towards Silencer and suddenly went through him. When Silencer threw Spider-Man and Elektra out the window, they did events that led to them getting the audiotape. Upon tracing the information the Hayden Planetarium, Spider-Man and Elektra started looking until they ran into Silencer who was posing as a part of the black hole mural. During the fight, Silencer discovered that a meteorite on display had a magnetic pull. Spider-Man then pushed the meteorite into Silencer which absorbed him and started burning. The meteorite was then placed in an airtight cell at Ravencroft.

Unnamed Silencer
The fifth Silencer is an inmate at the Big House prison. Mad Thinker enlisted her, 8-Ball, Absorbing Man, Dragon Man, Electro, Figment, Grey Gargoyle, Mandrill, Powderkeg, Sandman, Scarecrow, Tiger Shark, the U-Foes, Vermin, and the Wrecking Crew (Bulldozer, Piledriver, Thunderball, and Wrecker) in an escape plan. Silencer used her abilities to silence the sound of their escape while Scorpion was being attacked by one of Vermin's rats. After taking out the guards, Silencer and the other escapees stowed away on a visiting She-Hulk.

Powers and abilities
The Count Barzon version of Silencer wielded a gun that removed the power of speech from whoever it struck.

The Akiya Badaranaike version of Silencer has the ability to nullify sound waves. She also has enhanced strength.

The Dean Helm version of Silencer has no superhuman abilities. His uniform contains a device which nullifies all sonic energy within his vicinity. Hence, he cannot speak, nor does he make any noise as he moves. He is also equipped with a semi-automatic German Luger pistol, which in turn does not make any noise either. Silencer's uniform is insulated, making him immune to electronic attacks.

The mob enforcer version of Silencer has super-strength, teleportation, and a body composed of an unnamed murky substance which left him invulnerable and enabled him to shapeshift.

The unnamed Silencer can generate a "null sound" which nullifies any sound within a certain distance.

References

External links

Comics characters introduced in 1987
Marvel Comics female superheroes
Marvel Comics superheroes
Strikeforce: Morituri